Finn Mackay (born 1977/1978) is a British sociologist and radical trans feminist campaigner.

Mackay is a Senior Lecturer in sociology at University of the West of England, Bristol, and completed a PhD in the Centre for Gender & Violence Research at the University of Bristol. Mackay identifies as "a queer butch, or transmasc, identifying with much in the trans-with-an-asterisk label". During their teenage years, Mackay was part of an all-women's peace camp, where they became involved in lesbian feminism.

In 2004, Mackay founded the London Feminist Network, a group helping victims of domestic violence, and has argued against pornographication. They have also led a revival of the "Reclaim the Night" movement, and has written about its history. Mackay returned to academia to study the changes in the British women's liberation movement.

Books 
 Radical Feminism: Feminist Activism in Movement, Palgrave Macmillan, 2015.
 Female Masculinities and the Gender Wars: The Politics of Sex, Bloomsbury Publishing, 2021.

See also 
 Radical feminism
 Transgender feminism
 Feminist sex wars
 Feminist views on transgender topics

Notes

References 

Living people
British LGBT writers
English political writers
Transgender writers
Year of birth missing (living people)
Academics of the University of Bristol
Transgender academics
English sociologists
English feminists
English feminist writers
Radical feminists
Anti-pornography feminists
Anti-prostitution feminists
Sexual abuse victim advocates